Clinical Neurophysiology is a monthly peer reviewed medical journal published by Elsevier. It was established in 1949 as Electroencephalography and Clinical Neurophysiology and obtained its current title in 1999. The journal covers all aspects of neurophysiology, especially as relating to the pathophysiology underlying diseases of the central and peripheral nervous system. It is the official journal of the International Federation of Clinical Neurophysiology, the Brazilian Society of Clinical Neurophysiology, the Czech Society of Clinical Neurophysiology, the Italian Clinical Neurophysiology Society, and the International Society of Intraoperative Neurophysiology.

Abstracting and indexing
The journal is abstracted and indexed in:

According to the Journal Citation Reports, the journal has a 2017 impact factor of 3.614.

References

External links

International Federation of Clinical Neurophysiology
Brazilian Society of Clinical Neurophysiology 
Czech Society of Clinical Neurophysiology 
Italian Clinical Neurophysiology Society 
International Society of Intraoperative Neurophysiology

Neurology journals
Elsevier academic journals
English-language journals
Monthly journals
Publications established in 1949
Neurophysiology
Physiology journals
Academic journals associated with international learned and professional societies